Haleem is a type of stew that is widely consumed in South Asia, the Middle East and Central Asia. Although the dish varies from region to region, it optionally includes wheat or barley, meat and lentils. It is made by blending or mashing the meat in the curry and serving hot with flat breads or on its own. The original Haleem, which is different from this variety, is an ancient Iranian dish served with wheat, meat, cinnamon, and sugar that remains popular in Iran to this day. Popular variations of haleem include keşkek in Turkey, Afghanistan, Tajikistan, Uzbekistan, Azerbaijan and northern Iraq; harisa in the Arab world and Armenia; halim in Iran, West Bengal, in Mauritius and Bangladesh; and khichra in Pakistan and India.

Preparation

Haleem is made of 4 main components:
 Grain: with wheat or barley being almost always present. Pulses (such as lentil) and rice are used or not depending on the originating region of a recipe.
 Meat: usually beef or lamb and mutton; goat meat; or chicken
 Spices: containing a wide variety including cassia and fennel among others.
 Cooking liquid: either water, milk, or a broth.

This dish is slow cooked for seven to eight hours and then vigorously stirred or beaten with a pestle-like stirring stick. This results in a paste-like consistency, blending the flavors of spices, meat, barley and wheat.

In the end the cooked haleem is garnished with fried onions, julienne cut ginger, sliced green chillies, coriander leaves, lemon wedges and chaat masala. However, haleem preparation varies in different regions.

Origin
The origin of Haleem lies in the popular Arabian dish known as Harees (also written as Jareesh). According to Shoaib Daniyal, writing in The Sunday Guardian, the first written recipe of Harees dates back to the 10th century, when Arab scribe Abu Muhammad al-Muzaffar ibn Sayyar compiled a cookbook of dishes popular with the "kings and caliphs and lords and leaders" of Baghdad. "The version described in his Kitab Al-Tabikh (Book of Recipes), the world’s oldest surviving Arabic cookbook, is strikingly similar to the one people in the Middle East eat to this day" it reported. The Harees was cooked as the Arab empire was extended to different parts of the world.

Harees was introduced in the Indian subcontinent by the Arab soldiers of the Hyderabad Nizam's army to the city. Today, Harees is still available in the Arab quarter of Hyderabad, an area called Barkas, where the dish is called Jareesh. Later on, the people of Hyderabad modified it to suit their palate thus creating modern haleem.

Cultural history
Haleem is sold as a snack food in bazaars throughout the year. It is also a special dish prepared throughout the world during the Ramadan and Muharram months of the Muslim Hijri calendar, particularly among Pakistanis and Indian Muslims. Since the name of this dish is the same of one of the names of Allah, specifically Al Haleem, some neo-Orthodox fundamentalist South Asian Muslims have started to refer to this dish as "Daleem", reasoning that it is more correct since the South Asian version of this dish contains large amounts of dal, or lentils. It is mostly still referred to as Haleem.

In India, haleem prepared in Hyderabad during the Ramadan month, is transported all over the world through a special courier service. Haleem is traditionally cooked in large, wood-fired cauldrons.

Haleem is also very popular in Bangladesh, especially during the holy month of Ramadan, when it is a staple dish. However, the Bangladeshi version of halim differs from other areas slightly as the meat and bones are stewed and kept as small pieces instead of mashing them with the lentil soup. In addition, the variety of spices used is also different. One common  Bangladeshi version of Halim is called “Shahi Halim”; it is mostly popular in the central part of the country.

In Pakistan, Haleem is available all year round, as well as in most Pakistani restaurants around the world. Haleem is sold as a snack food and street food in Pakistani bazaars throughout the year.

It is a tradition among Persian Jews to eat haleem on Shabbat, since like other Shabbat stews such as cholent and hamin it's a slow-cooked dish that can be prepared before the beginning of Shabbat and then cooked overnight at a low temperature.

Hyderabadi haleem

Haleem has become a popular dish in the cities of Hyderabad, Telangana and Aurangabad, Maharashtra (Aurangabad, the first capital of Hyderabad State) in India. Originating from an Arabic dish called Harees, Haleem was introduced to the region during the Mughal period by foreign migrants.

In 2010 Hyderabadi haleem was awarded Geographical Indication status by the Indian GI registry office. It became the first meat product of India to receive a GI certification. This means that a dish cannot be sold as Hyderabadi haleem unless it meets the necessary standards laid down for it.

Khichra

In the Indian subcontinent, both haleem and khichra are made with similar ingredients. In khichra, the chunks of meat remain as cubes, while in haleem the meat cubes are taken out of the pot, bones are removed, the meat is crushed and put back in the pot. It is further cooked until the meat completely blends with the lentils, wheat and barley mixture.

Nutrition
A high-calorie dish, haleem provides protein from the meat and fibre and carbohydrates from the various combinations of grains and pulses.

Serving
Haleem can be served with chopped mint leaves, lemon juice, coriander leaves, fried onions, chopped ginger root or green chilies. In some regions of Pakistan, Haleem is eaten with Naan or with any type of bread or rice.

See also

 List of stews
 List of Pakistani soups and stews
 
Harees

References

Further reading

 

Indian soups and stews
Indian meat dishes
Pakistani soups and stews
Pakistani meat dishes
Bangladeshi soups and stews
Bangladeshi meat dishes
Bengali cuisine
Mauritian cuisine
Muhajir cuisine
Lentil dishes
Iranian stews
Iraqi cuisine
Turkish cuisine
Azerbaijani cuisine
Street food